Randall Lemont Evans (born December 26, 1991) is an American professional gridiron football defensive back who is a free agent. He most recently played for the Ottawa Redblacks of the Canadian Football League (CFL). He was drafted by the Philadelphia Eagles in the sixth round of the 2015 NFL Draft as the 196th overall pick. He played college football at Kansas State. He has also been a member of the San Diego Chargers and Hamilton Tiger-Cats.

Early years
Evans lettered all four years at Miami Palmetto High School and helped the Panthers earn a 9–3 record and a state runner-up finish as a junior. He picked off seven passes and recorded 65 tackles as a junior and came back with five interceptions and 50 tackles as a senior. He participated in the inaugural Miami-Dade/Broward Public vs. Private All-Star Game in January 2010.

He played collegiately at Kansas State.

Professional career

Philadelphia Eagles
Evans was selected in the sixth round of the 2015 NFL Draft as the 196th overall pick by the Philadelphia Eagles. On September 4, 2015 Evans was cut in the final preseason cuts. On September 6, 2015, Evans was signed to the Philadelphia Eagles practice squad. On January 2, 2016, Evans was promoted to the active roster after the Eagles placed nose tackle Bennie Logan on injured reserve with a calf injury. On August 28, 2016, Evans was waived by the Eagles.

San Diego Chargers
On December 7, 2016, Evans was signed to the San Diego Chargers' practice squad. He signed a reserve/future contract with the Chargers on January 3, 2017. He was waived on September 2, 2017.

Hamilton Tiger-Cats 
Evans joined the Hamilton Tiger-Cats of the Canadian Football League (CFL) in time for the 2018 season, playing one game with the team before being released.

Ottawa Redblacks
Evans was signed onto the Ottawa Redblacks' practice roster on August 8, 2018. In his first season in Ottawa Evans played in five games and contributed with 15 defensive tackles. Evans, had a breakout year in 2019, Evans suited up for 17 games in 2019, recording 56 defensive tackles and 12 more tackles on special teams. After the 2020 season was cancelled Evans re-signed with the Ottawa Redblacks on January 26, 2021. Evans continued his strong play during the 2021 season, playing in all 14 regular season games and accumulating a career-high 70 defensive tackles to go along with 12 special teams tackles, four quarterback sacks, two interceptions and two forced fumbles. Evans and the Redblacks agreed to another contract extension on February 1, 2022. In 2022, he played in nine games and recorded 36 tackles before being released on August 22, 2022.

Personal
Evans is the son of Sheldon Evans and Melissa Doctor. He graduated from Kansas State University with two bachelor's degrees; one in sociology with an emphasis in criminology and the other in American ethnic studies.

References

External links
 Kansas State Wildcats Player bio
 Philadelphia Eagles Player bio

1991 births
Living people
American football cornerbacks
Kansas State Wildcats football players
Miami Palmetto Senior High School alumni
Players of American football from Miami
Philadelphia Eagles players
San Diego Chargers players
Los Angeles Chargers players
Hamilton Tiger-Cats players
Canadian football defensive backs
Ottawa Redblacks players
Players of Canadian football from Miami